Marie Powers (1902–1973) was an American contralto who was best known for her performance as Madame Flora in Gian Carlo Menotti’s The Medium, a role that she played on stage, screen and television.

Early life 
On June 20, 1902, Powers was born in Mount Carmel, Pennsylvania. At 17, Powers left home to study singing in Milan, Italy.

Education 
Powers studied music and language at Cornell University. Powers studied at the Royal Conservatory in Florence, Italy.

Career 
Powers sneaked into a friend’s audition before the conductor Arturo Toscanini at La Scala and landed a part with the legendary opera company.
 
In 1947, Italian writer Lanfranco Rasponi introduced her to Menotti, who was casting the role of the fraudulent psychic in his opera The Medium.  The opera was staged on Broadway along with another one-act Menotti opera, The Telephone, or L'Amour à trois. Powers was hailed as a star for her dramatic performance as the phony psychic, and she repeated the role on live television in 1948 and in an expanded film production directed by Menotti in 1951.

Later Broadway work for Powers included the 1957 revival of the musical Carousel and the original 1960 production of Becket, where she played the Queen Mother.

Personal life 
Powers married Luigi Crescenti, an Italian Count. In 1938, Powers' husband died.

On December 29, 1973, Powers died of heart failure in New York City, New York.

References

External links 
 Marie Powers at allmusic.com
 

American operatic contraltos
1902 births
1973 deaths
Cornell University alumni
People from Mount Carmel, Pennsylvania
Singers from Pennsylvania
20th-century American women opera singers
Classical musicians from Pennsylvania